Mvouti (can also be written as Mvuti) is a town in the Kouilou Region of southern Republic of Congo.

Transport 

It is served by a station on the national railway network.

See also 

 Railway stations in Congo

References 

Kouilou Department
Populated places in the Republic of the Congo